The second season of RuPaul's Secret Celebrity Drag Race premiered August 12, 2022 on VH1. This season featured a major retool of the spin-off, with nine celebrity contestants — concealed by drag personas — competing in a season-length lip sync tournament. RuPaul, Michelle Visage, Carson Kressley and Ross Mathews returned as judges.

The season was won by Backstreet Boys member AJ McLean (as "Poppy Love"), with Tatyana Ali ("Chakra 7") and Mark Indelicato (" Thirsty von Trap") as runners-up, and Ali being voted as Miss Congeniality by the contestants.

Background
Unlike the first season, which featured self-contained competitions based on the format of the main series, season 2 of Secret Celebrity Drag Race featured a season-length lip-sync competition with celebrities concealed via drag personas (a la The Masked Singer), with the champion receiving $100,000 for a charity of their choice. In each episode, the queens each gave a lip sync performance for the judges and a studio audience. The bottom two queens competed in a Lip Sync for Your Life for a chance to be saved from elimination; the eliminated queen would then reveal their true identity at the end of the show. One exception to this format came in its seventh episode, where the top 4 additionally competed in the recurring "Snatch Game" challenge.

Brooke Lynn Hytes, Jujubee and Monét X Change served as the "Queen Supremes", providing commentary for the series as well as assisting and mentoring the contestants. There were also special appearances by Eureka, Gottmik, Katya, Morgan McMichaels, Silky Nutmeg Ganache and Violet Chachki.

Contestants

Contestant progress

Lip syncs
Legend:

Episodes

Episode 1: I'm Coming Out - First Time in Drag! (August 12)

Episode 2: Dance Your Padded Ass Off! (August 19)

Episode 3: Money, Honey (August 26)

Episode 4: Drag Duets (September 2)
The remaining queens were paired with Eureka!, Gottmik, Katya, Morgan McMichaels, Silky Nutmeg Ganache and Violet Chachki.

Episode 5: I Love the 90s (September 9)

Episode 6: RuPaul-A-Palooza! (September 16)

Episode 7: Yaaas Gaga (September 23)

Episode 8: Grande Finale (September 30)

The three Queen Supremes Brooke Lynn Hytes, Jujubee and Monét X Change performed together RuPaul’s "Blame It on the Edit".

References

External links
 Official site (in English)

2020 American television series debuts
2020s American LGBT-related television series
2020s American reality television series
American LGBT-related reality television series
American television spin-offs
Celebrity reality television series
Drag Race (franchise) seasons
Reality television spin-offs
RuPaul's Drag Race
Television series by World of Wonder (company)
VH1 original programming
2022 American television seasons